Wonderful Wanda is a studio album by American recording artist Wanda Jackson. It was released in August 1962 via Capitol Records and contained 12 tracks. It was the fourth studio album in Jackson's music career and her first to consist entirely of country music songs. Wonderful Wanda included the songs "In the Middle of a Heartache", "A Little Bitty Tear" and "If I Cried Every Time You Hurt Me". All three recordings became commercially-successful singles on both the country and pop charts respectively.

Background and content
In the 1950s, Wanda Jackson became one of the United States' first female Rockabilly performers. During this era she recorded singles like "Fujiyama Mama" and "Let's Have a Party". In 1961, Jackson returned to the country market with the single "Right or Wrong". After the song's country success, Jackson traveled to Nashville, Tennessee to record more country sides with producer Ken Nelson. According to Jackson and fellow-writer/historian Scott Bomar, it was the first Nashville sessions to feature musician Roy Clark on guitar. It was also among her first sessions to feature orchestra and string arrangements. 

The sessions for Wonderful Wanda were held at the Bradley Studio in Nashville between April 1961 and February 1962. The album was a collection of 12 songs. Both "I'd Be Ashamed" and "In the Middle of a Heartache" were penned by Jackson herself. Also included were cover versions of songs first made successful by other artists. "Is It Wrong (For Loving You)", which was first made popular by Warner Mack, while "Seven Lonely Days" was first made successful by Georgia Gibbs. Other songwriters included on the album project were Hank Cochran and Harlan Howard.

Release and reception

Wonderful Wanda was released in August 1962 on Capitol Records and was the fourth proper studio release of Jackson's career. The album was originally distributed as a vinyl LP containing six songs on either side of the record. In later years, it was distributed to digital and streaming sites, including Apple Music, which issued the album on Capitol Records Nashville. Wonderful Wanda received a positive review from Billboard magazine following its original release. "In all moods she's in fine form here and the fans will quickly dig," staff writers noted.

Prior to the album's release, Jackson had reached success with its first single, "In the Middle of a Heartache". The song spent 15 weeks on the Billboard Hot Country Songs and peaked at number six in January 1962, becoming her highest-charting disc on the survey. It also became her third single to chart on the Billboard Hot 100, peaking at number 27 in December 1961. It was followed by Jackson's version of "A Little Bitty Tear", which was released as a single in December 1961 and peaked at number 84 on the Hot 100 in January 1962. In March 1962, "If I Cried Every Time You Hurt Me" was issued as the project's final single. Not only did it peak at number 58 on the Billboard Hot 100, it also climbed to number 28 on the country songs chart and number 16 on the adult contemporary singles chart. In addition, both "A Little Bitty Tear" and "In the Middle of a Heartache" reached lower-charting positions in Australia in 1962.

Track listings

Vinyl version

Digital version

Release history

References

1962 albums
Albums produced by Ken Nelson (United States record producer)
Capitol Records albums
Wanda Jackson albums